Bentwich is a surname. Notable people with the surname include:

Helen Bentwich (1892–1972), British philanthropist and politician
Herbert Bentwich (1856–1932), British Zionist leader and lawyer
Joseph Bentwich (1902–1982), Israeli educator
Norman Bentwich (1883–1971), British barrister and legal academic